Steven Mark Cowe (born 29 September 1974) is an English footballer who played in the Football League as a forward for Swindon Town. He began his career with Aston Villa, but never played for their first team, and went on to play for numerous non-league teams. He retired from football in 2009.

References

External links
 

1974 births
Living people
Footballers from Gloucester
English footballers
Association football forwards
Aston Villa F.C. players
Swindon Town F.C. players
Hereford United F.C. players
Newport County A.F.C. players
Forest Green Rovers F.C. players
Redditch United F.C. players
Weston-super-Mare A.F.C. players
Cirencester Town F.C. players
Cinderford Town A.F.C. players
English Football League players
National League (English football) players
Southern Football League players